The Gunner Ministry was the ministry of the 11th Chief Minister of the Northern Territory, Michael Gunner.  It came into operation on 31 August 2016, succeeding the Giles Country Liberal ministry, and ended on 13 May 2022, succeeded by the Fyles ministry.

First (caretaker) ministry
Although Territory Labor's landslide victory in the 2016 election was beyond doubt, a number of prospective ministers—including Labor deputy leader and presumptive Deputy Chief Minister Lynne Walker—had not been confirmed as winners in their seats.  For this reason, Gunner had himself, Natasha Fyles, and Nicole Manison sworn in as an interim three-person government on 31 August 2016 until a full ministry could be named.

First (full) ministry
On 11 September, the following members were announced as ministers after a Labor Party caucus meeting.   By this time, it had been confirmed that Walker had lost her own seat, so Gunner tapped Manison to become the new deputy leader of Territory Labor and hence Deputy Chief Minister.  Gunner also announced that all backbench members of his large caucus will serve as junior ministers, at no extra cost to taxpayers. The new cabinet was sworn in the following day. Notably, it was majority-female; five of its eight members were women.

Second ministry
Gunner's first reshuffle of his cabinet was announced and sworn in on 26 June 2018. Selena Uibo was promoted to the ministry as Minister for Education and Training.

Third ministry
On 21 December 2018, Ken Vowles was expelled from the Cabinet for "breaking cabinet confidentiality". Assistant ministers Jeff Collins and Scott McConnell also lost their roles. Paul Kirby joined the ministry as Minister for Primary Industry and Resources.

Fourth ministry
The fourth Gunner ministry was announced on 7 September 2020, following the 2020 Northern Territory general election.

References

External links
 The Cabinet

Northern Territory ministries